Desperate Trails is a 1921 American silent Western film directed by John Ford and featuring Harry Carey. The film is considered to be lost.

Plot
As described in a film publication, Bart Carson (Carey) is in love with Lou (La Marr) and even goes to jail to save Walter A. Walker (Coxen), a man she says is her brother but who is really a husband who has deserted his wife and two children. After he learns the truth, Bart breaks out of jail and trails Walter, who falls off a train trying to escape. Bart then seeks refuge in a cabin with Mrs. Walker (Rich),  where he is captured, but the officials have learned the truth and promise him a pardon.

Cast
 Harry Carey as Bart Carson
 Irene Rich as Mrs. Walker
 George E. Stone as Dannie Boy
 Helen Field as Carrie
 Edward Coxen as Walter A. Walker
 Barbara La Marr as Lady Lou
 George Siegmann as Sheriff Price
 Charles Inslee as Doc Higgins

Production and release
Courtney Ryley Cooper wrote the story Christmas Eve at Pilot Butte which was later purchased by the Universal Film Manufacturing Company. The screenplay was written by Elliott J. Clawson and directed by John Ford.

Filming of Desperate Trails started on March 14, 1921, under the working title of Christmas Eve at Pilot Butte, and lasted until April 11, with Harry C. Fowler and Robert De Grasse serving as the photographers. The movie was released on July 9.

See also
 Harry Carey filmography

References

External links

 

1921 films
1921 Western (genre) films
1921 lost films
American black-and-white films
Films directed by John Ford
Lost Western (genre) films
Lost American films
Universal Pictures films
Silent American Western (genre) films
1920s American films
1920s English-language films